Bryn Athyn College is a private Christian college in Bryn Athyn, Pennsylvania. It is affiliated with the General Church of the New Jerusalem.

History
Bryn Athyn College started educating undergraduates after its incorporation under the laws of the Commonwealth of Pennsylvania in 1877. Then known as the Academy of the New Church, in 1890, the academy established a separate organization, the General Church of the New Jerusalem, a religious body based on the teachings of Emanuel Swedenborg. After receiving an endowment from John Pitcairn and others, the Academy of the New Church expanded from a seminary into a high school and a two-year college. In 1914, it became a four-year college, and by 1922, the college was also conferring Bachelor of Arts and Bachelor of Science degrees. In 1997, the Academy of the New Church College adopted a new name: Bryn Athyn College of the New Church.

In August 2008, the college opened several new student residence cottages. A new science center and a new admissions and student life building were completed in September 2009.

Campus
The college's original campus and surrounding community of Bryn Athyn were designed in 1893 by Charles Eliot of the firm Olmsted, Olmsted and Eliot. The campus is located in the borough of Bryn Athyn, in the suburbs of Philadelphia.

Facilities
Pendleton Hall (Classrooms, Main College Office, Offices, Auditorium)
Swedenborg Library (Library, Archives, Computer Lab)
Asplundh Field House (Athletic Facility)
Mitchell Performing Arts Center (Theater)
Fine Arts Center (Fine Arts Facilities, Classrooms)
Dining Hall
Childs Hall (Housing)
Grant Hall (Housing)
Residence Cottages (Housing)
College Grounds Café
Grant R. Doering Center for Science and Research (Completed Fall 2009)
Brickman Center for Student Life and Admissions (Completed Fall 2009)
Jungé Ice Rink and Pavilion (Athletic/Recreational Facility)
Social Center
Glencairn Museum
Bryn Athyn Cathedral
Cairnwood Estate (Historic Tours and Special Events Facility)

Historic District Buildings
The Bryn Athyn Historic District includes:

Glencairn Museum
Glencairn Museum's ancient Egyptian, Greek, and Roman, medieval Christian, Islamic, Asian, and Native American collections educate visitors on the history of religion. The museum was built between 1928 and 1939 as a home for Raymond and Mildred Pitcairn. In 1979, the building was donated to the Academy of the New Church to serve as the school's museum of medieval and religious art.

Bryn Athyn Cathedral
Bryn Athyn Cathedral is the center of the New Church community and serves as a religious center for Bryn Athyn College students. Construction on the Gothic revivalist architecture began in 1913, and carried on until the late 1920s.

In Bryn Athyn Cathedral there are no right angles or straight lines. The walls of the building are skewed against each other, bowing out in the middle only to return at the opposite wall.

Cairnwood Estate
Cairnwood was designed by the architectural firm Carrère and Hastings and was completed in 1895. It served as the home of John Pitcairn, founder of the Pittsburgh Plate Glass Company, and his wife Gertrude until 1916, after which it stood vacant for years. In 1994, the Academy of the New Church renovated the building. Cairnwood now functions as a cultural and hospitality center serving the college, community, and surrounding area.

Religion
Bryn Athyn College is affiliated with the New Church, a branch of Christianity based on the Bible and the theological writings of Emanuel Swedenborg. The college offers religious courses, a religion major, and worship services.

Education at Bryn Athyn emphasizes the practical application of truth to life and encourages students to connect their spiritual beliefs to both their studies and their daily lives. Student conduct policies are guided by moral principles, with a particular emphasis on acting honestly, respectfully, and charitably and living a life of useful service.

Mission Statement: Bryn Athyn College of the New Church serves as an intellectual center for all who desire to pursue a higher education in the liberal arts and sciences, enriched and structured by the Old and New Testaments and the writings of Emanuel Swedenborg. The purpose of this education is to enhance students' civil, moral, and spiritual lives, as well as to contribute to human spiritual welfare.

Academics
Bryn Athyn College operates on a trimester system. Fall Term usually begins in late August and continues until Thanksgiving break; Winter Term runs from after Thanksgiving until March (with a break over the Christmas holiday); Spring Term then runs from late March until the end of May.

The college's educational philosophy is grounded in the teachings of Emanuel Swedenborg and the benefits of a liberal arts program. The curriculum emphasizes  experiential learning.

Athletics
Bryn Athyn College teams participate as a member of the National Collegiate Athletic Association's Division III. The Lions are a member of the Colonial States Athletic Conference (CSAC) as of the 2018–19 academic year. Prior to the 2014 season, the college competed as a member of the USCAA. Men's sports include basketball, cross country, ice hockey, lacrosse, soccer and tennis; while women's sports include basketball, cross country, lacrosse, tennis and volleyball.

Arts
Bryn Athyn College offers both courses and extracurricular arts opportunities in studio arts, theater, and music. Arts courses at Bryn Athyn include drawing and painting, ceramics, metals, photography, and art history.

Student life
Bryn Athyn student life is largely student-run. Student Government and the Social Committee plan regular activities both on and off campus.

See also
 The New Church
 Emanuel Swedenborg
 Glencairn Museum
 Bryn Athyn Cathedral
 Bryn Athyn, Pennsylvania

References

External links
 Official website

Educational institutions established in 1877
Universities and colleges in Montgomery County, Pennsylvania
Bryn Athyn, Pennsylvania
General Church of the New Jerusalem
Private universities and colleges in Pennsylvania
1877 establishments in Pennsylvania
Colonial States Athletic Conference schools
Former United East Conference schools